Pycnoclavella  is a genus of sea squirts first circumscribed by Walter Garstang in 1891. The generic name comes from the Ancient Greek  (puknós) meaning "closely united". In 1990, Patricia Kott placed Pycnoclavella in its own family, Pycnoclavellidae, but in 2008 it was moved back to Clavelinidae.

, WoRMS recognizes the following species:

 Pycnoclavella arenosa 
 Pycnoclavella atlantica 
 Pycnoclavella aurantia 
 Pycnoclavella aurilucens 
 Pycnoclavella belizeana 
 Pycnoclavella brava 
 Pycnoclavella communis 
 Pycnoclavella detorta 
 Pycnoclavella diminuta 
 Pycnoclavella elongata 
 Pycnoclavella filamentosa 
 Pycnoclavella flava 
 Pycnoclavella inflorescens 
 Pycnoclavella kottae 
 Pycnoclavella martae 
 Pycnoclavella minuta 
 Pycnoclavella nana 
 Pycnoclavella narcissus 
 Pycnoclavella neapolitana 
 Pycnoclavella producta 
 Pycnoclavella stanleyi 
 Pycnoclavella stolonialis 
 Pycnoclavella tabella 
 Pycnoclavella taureanensis

References

Enterogona
Tunicate genera